Nigel Hall  (born 30 August 1943 in Bristol) is an English sculptor and a draughtsman.

Life 
Hall's grandfather was a stonemason working on churches and cathedrals and Hall was able to observe this work and the carving of stone was to influence his sculptures and drawings. He studied at the West of England College of Art, Bristol from 1960 to 1964 and at the Royal College of Art, London from 1964 to 1967. A Harkness Fellowship took him to United States, to Canada and Mexico from 1967 to 1969. Only later, back in London, he travelled to Japan, Korea and Switzerland. From 1971 to 1981 Hall was a lecturer and external examiner of the Royal College of Art, London and ran the MA sculpture course at Chelsea College of Art and Design.

Hall lives and works in London. He was elected to the Royal Academy of Arts in 2003.

Works 
Hall has always created single and multi-coloured drawings. Since the 1960s he has also worked on sculptures and spatial structures. The interplay of shadows and balance in the works mean that their placement, whether indoors or outside, is important. Hall finds the landscape of the Mojave Desert and Swiss Alps spaces of silence and vastness. This influences his drawings and he keeps a diary of sketches on his frequent travels. His drawings represent more than half of his total work.
 
His location-based installation art is internationally known. A two-part wall relief in painted and gilded wood at the entrance of Providence Tower, Dallas (1989), a wall sculpture at the entrance to the Australian National Gallery, Canberra (1982), and his largest sculpture, a free-standing steel work at the entrance to the Thameslink tunnel, London, 1993.

Selected exhibitions 
 Solo exhibitions: 1967: Galerie Givaudan, Paris, France,  - 1982: Kunsthalle Baden-Baden, Germany, - 1995: Veranneman Foundation, Kruishoutem, Belgium, - 1998: New York Studio School Gallery, New York City, - 2001: Foundation Sculpture at Schoenthal, Langenbruck, Switzerland, - 2004:  Kunsthalle Mannheim, Mannheim, Germany, - 2008: Park Ryu Sook Gallery, Seoul, South Korea, - 2008 Nigel Hall: Sculpture and Drawing 1965-2008 - Yorkshire Sculpture Park, Wakefield, West Yorkshire
 Group exhibitions: 1975: Biennale de Paris, Paris, France, - 1977: documenta 6, Kassel, Germany, - 2002/03: Peggy Guggenheim Collection, Venice, Italy, - 2001, 2003, 2005: "Blickachsen", Bad Homburg vor der Höhe, Germany, 2006: Museum of Fine Arts, Ostend, Belgium - 2015: British Art +, Museum Biedermann, Donaueschingen, Germany
 Public collections: Tate Gallery, London, - Musee National d'Art Moderne, Paris, France, - Neue Nationalgalerie, Berlin, Germany, - Tokyo Metropolitan Art Museum, Japan, - National Museum of Art, Osaka, Japan, - Museum of Contemporary Art, Sydney, Australia, - Dallas Museum of Fine Art, Texas, USA, - Tel Aviv Museum of Art, Israel

Hall's sculpture Soda Lake was featured in Richard Alston's dance as the physical set for the piece. The dance piece was named after the sculpture. The sculpture was inspired by Soda Lake which can be found in the Mojave desert. One part of the sculpture is a thin metal pole which stretched up at an angle and has a large elliptical loop attached at its apex. The second part is a thicker pole which is hung diametrically opposite the point at which the loop is attached to the thin pole, and is suspended so that it does not quite reach the ground. This is in two parts, the top section being marginally fatter than the lower. The upper end of the pole is slightly pointed whilst its lower end is bluntly rounded. The sculpture is made of fiberglass and aluminium and is painted gloss black. Hall used the concept of silence found at the landscape of Soda Lake and translated it into his sculpture through hanging one of the poles above the ground slightly.

Selected sculpture parks 
 Yorkshire Sculpture Park, Wakefield, West Yorkshire
 Cass Sculpture at Goodwood
 Sculpture garden Kunsthalle Mannheim, Mannheim, Germany
 Foundation Sculpture at Schoenthal, Langenbruck, Switzerland

Gallery

Selected literature 
 Nigel Hall: Sculpture and Drawings, exh, cat., Annely Juda Fine Art, London, 1978
 Nigel Hall: Skulpturen und Zeichnungen, exh. cat., Kunsthalle Baden-Baden, Germany, 1982
 Nigel Hall: Hidden Valleys, exh. cat., Kunsthalle Mannheim, Germany, 2004
 Nigel Hall: Other Voices, Other Rooms, exh. Cat., Galerie Scheffel, Bad Homburg vor der Höhe, Germany, 2007
 Andrew Lambirth: Nigel Hall - Sculpture and Works on Paper. Royal Academy Books, London, 2008.  - (The text is drawn from transcriptions of interviews with the artist recorded by Andrew Lambirth for the "Artist's Lives" project for the "National Life Stories". The British Library)
 Nigel Hall: Chinese Whispers, exh. cat., Galerie Andresthalmann, Zürich, 2010

References

External links 

 Biographical details
 Nigel Hall: Sculpture + Drawings 1965 – 2008 at Yorkshire Sculpture Park
 Profile on Royal Academy of Arts Collections
 

1943 births
Living people
People educated at Bristol Grammar School
20th-century British sculptors
21st-century sculptors
English sculptors
English male sculptors
Royal Academicians
Artists from Bristol